Euryeulia is a genus of moths belonging to the family Tortricidae.

Species
Euryeulia biocellata (Walsingham, 1914)

Etymology
The genus name is derived from Greek eurys (meaning broad) and Eulia, the type genus of the tribe.

See also
List of Tortricidae genera

References

 , 2003, Proceedings of the entomological Society of Washington 105: 631.
 , 2005, World Catalogue of Insects 5

External links
tortricidae.com

Euliini
Tortricidae genera